Chegou Quem Faltava (Portuguese for "Who Was Missing Has Arrived") is the third live album by Brazilian alternative rock band Charlie Brown Jr. Their first posthumous album since 2013's La Familia 013, it was released on July 13, 2021 through Sony Music, their first album on the label since 2009's Camisa 10 Joga Bola Até na Chuva.

The album was originally recorded during a gig at Citibank Hall in São Paulo on March 19, 2011 and was scheduled for a CD and DVD release later that year, but due to line-up changes (the departure of Heitor Gomes and return of Champignon and Marcão Britto) in the middle of that year, it was scrapped and the band left Sony to sign with Radar Records and release Música Popular Caiçara the following year. On March 15, 2021, Alexandre Ferreira Lima Abrão, son of late Charlie Brown Jr.'s vocalist Chorão, struck a deal with Sony Music with the intent of releasing posthumous compilations of outtakes and other rarities by the band, and Chegou Quem Faltava was announced on June 8.

The album was initially released digitally in parts; the first part came out on June 18, containing ten tracks. The second part came out on July 2, containing ten more tracks. The complete album, plus its DVD version, was released on July 13, totaling 29 tracks. The show was also made available for streaming on YouTube. On July 30, the bonus disc Chegou Quem Faltava – Versão do Chorão (or "Chorão's Version") was released, containing additional monologues and Chorão's interactions with the audience, totaling 38 tracks.

Track listing

Personnel

Charlie Brown Jr. 
 Chorão: vocals
 Thiago Castanho: electric and acoustic guitar and backing vocals
 Heitor Gomes: bass guitar
 Bruno Graveto: drums

References

2021 video albums
Live video albums
2021 live albums
Charlie Brown Jr. albums
Sony Music Brazil albums
Portuguese-language live albums